Daryon Marquee Brutley (born May 31, 1979) is a former American football defensive back. He briefly played for the Philadelphia Eagles in 2003. Brutley played college football at Southern Miss and Northern Iowa.

Daryon Brutley is currently the Vice President of sales for Revera Marketing's Mobile Application Snook.

References

External links 

1979 births
Living people
People from Eufaula, Alabama
American football defensive backs
Northern Iowa Panthers football players
Philadelphia Eagles players
Berlin Thunder players
Carolina Cobras players
Ohio Valley Greyhounds players
South Georgia Wildcats players
Tampa Bay Storm players
RiverCity Rage players
New Orleans VooDoo players